The Men's 4x200m Freestyle Relay at the 2007 Pan American Games took place at the Maria Lenk Aquatic Park in Rio de Janeiro, Brazil, with the final being swum on July 17.

Medalists

Results

Finals

Preliminaries
Heats weren't performed.

References
For the Record, Swimming World Magazine, September 2007 (p. 48+49)

Freestyle Relay, Men's 4x200